"Money Changes Everything" is a song by American rock band the Brains from their eponymous debut studio album (1980). Originally released in 1978, the song was reissued as the lead single from the album in 1980, by Mercury Records. Frontman Tom Gray is credited as the sole writer of the song, while production was collectively helmed by the Brains and Bruce Baxter. The song was popularized in 1984 by Cyndi Lauper, who released a cover version of the song as a single from her debut studio album, She's So Unusual (1983).

Background
The original single was released in 1978 by the Brains as a 45 rpm single on Gray Matter Records. The B side of the single was a song called "Quick with Your Lip". The initial underground success of the song led to the Brains being signed by Mercury Records. They rerecorded the song under the guidance of producer Steve Lillywhite for their 1980 debut album, The Brains. Critic Greil Marcus, listing it at number 10 of his Real-Life Rock Top Ten 1979, said, "Singer Tom Gray told his story in a strangled voice, as if he were trying to explain, but instead he laid a curse. This damned single ranks higher than I've placed it, but if it were anywhere else I couldn't end with it, and there's no other way the decade could end." Marcus would later write of the song, "It was hard, it hurt, and Cyndi Lauper's version makes the original sound compromised. She makes you wonder if Brains composer and singer Tom Gray even knew what he was talking about."

Gray, with his band Delta Moon, also recorded a version of the song for their 2007 album Clear Blue Flame.

Critical reception
Ralph Heibutzki of AllMusic highlighted the "sassy cynicism" of the song, further commenting that "Money Changes Everything" represented a concession to "mainstream sensibilities" for The Brains.

Track listings and formats
 7" vinyl
 "Money Changes Everything"  – 3:35
 "Quick With Your Lip"  – 3:23
 7" vinyl reissue
 "Money Changes Everything"  – 3:25
 "Girl in a Magazine"  – 3:07

Credits and personnel
Credits and personnel are adapted from the "Money Changes Everything" single liner notes.
 Bryan Smithwick – bass, producer
 Tom Gray – writer, vocals, keyboards, producer
 Charles Wolff – drums, producer
 Rick Price – guitar, producer
 Bruce Baxter – producer

Cyndi Lauper version

Cyndi Lauper's recording of "Money Changes Everything" was released as the fifth single from her album She's So Unusual. It has been released in over 27 variations across the world, the most common being a two track 7" vinyl single (with varying covers). There was also a less common 12" vinyl single version.  Lauper's cover features an appearance by Rob Hyman of the band the Hooters, playing his "hooter" (a Hohner Melodica) on the song's solo.

Lauper recorded an acoustic version, with guest artist Adam Lazzara (from the band Taking Back Sunday), for her 2005 album The Body Acoustic. "Money Changes Everything" became She's So Unusuals  first release to fail to achieve top 10 status on the Billboard Hot 100, peaking at number 27.

Critical reception
Stewart Mason of AllMusic praised Lauper's cover version, stating that the song's arrangement "is brighter, sharper and much more commercial than the Brains' rather weedy, comparatively lo-fi and dullish take on their own song." He further praised Lauper's singing abilities, particularly the long note she holds at the climax of the song. Billboard described the song as "hard rock meets hard realities" and designated it as one of the new releases with the greatest chart potential.  Cash Box called the song "a hard rocking effort which forgoes any novel vocal twist" that provides "a sad look at the realities of cash and its effects."

Music video
A live video was directed by Phil Tuckett and produced by Alan Saperstein of NFL Films Entertainment at The Summit in Houston on Oct. 10, 1984.

Track listings and formats

US 7" Single
 "Money Changes Everything" (Live) - 4:13
 "Money Changes Everything" (Edit) - 3:59

UK 7" Single (First Release)
 "Money Changes Everything" (Edit) - 3:58
 "He's So Unusual" - 0:45
 "Yeah Yeah" - 3:17

UK 7" Single (Second Release)
 "Money Changes Everything" (Edit) - 3:58
 "Money Changes Everything" (Live) - 4:13

European 12" Single
 "Money Changes Everything" (That Live Version) - 6:04
 "Money Changes Everything" (This Live Version) - 5:29

Japanese 12" Single
 "Money Changes Everything" (Special Live Extended Version) - 6:26
 "Money Changes Everything" (Special Live Version) - 5:51

UK 12" Single (First Release)
 "Money Changes Everything" (LP version) – 5:02
 "He's So Unusual" – 0:45
 "Yeah Yeah" – 3:17
 "Girls Just Want to Have Fun" (Xtra Fun) – 5:05

UK 12" Single (Second Release)
 "Money Changes Everything" (LP version) - 5:02
 "Money Changes Everything" (Live) - 6:23
 "Girls Just Want to Have Fun" (Xtra Fun) - 5:05

Personnel 

 Cyndi Lauper – lead vocals, backing vocals, arrangements
 Rob Hyman – keyboards, backing vocals, arrangements
 Eric Bazilian – arrangements, melodica, guitars, backing vocals
 Neil Jason – bass guitar
 Anton Fig – drums, percussion

Charts

References

1978 songs
1978 singles
1984 singles
Cyndi Lauper songs
Song recordings produced by Steve Lillywhite
Epic Records singles
Mercury Records singles
Song recordings produced by Rick Chertoff